Masaya Tomida (born 15 September 1977) is a Japanese professional golfer.

Tomida was born in Mie Prefecture. He currently plays on the Japan Golf Tour where he has won once in 2009 at the Tsuruya Open.

Professional wins (2)

Japan Golf Tour wins (1)

*Note: The 2009 Tsuruya Open was shortened to 54 holes due to rain.

Japan Challenge Tour wins (1)

External links

Japanese male golfers
Japan Golf Tour golfers
Sportspeople from Mie Prefecture
1977 births
Living people